Elena Rossini is an Italian filmmaker, writer and artist best known for the documentary film The Illusionists. In October 2014, Rossini was selected for the Young Leaders program by the Council for the United States and Italy. Rossini is the founder and editor-in-chief of No Country for Young Women, a now-defunct website that aims to provide "positive role models" for young girls. In 2014, Rossini and Elian Carsenat founded Gender Gap Grader – a platform empowering companies and organizations with innovative tools to measure the gender gap.

Personal life
Rossini is originally from Como, Italy. She studied at Pepperdine University in the United States and divides her time between Paris and Como.

Filmography

The Illusionists
The Illusionists is a documentary about the marketing of unattainable beauty ideals around the world. Filming locations included the U.S., U.K., the Netherlands, France, Italy, Lebanon, India and Japan. Rossini has plans for a sequel called Illusionists Too which will focus on the influence of social media on self-esteem and self-image.

References

External links
 
 Elena Rossini official site
 The Illusionists

Italian film directors
Italian women film directors
Living people
Year of birth missing (living people)